Suffolk County Council is the administrative authority for the county of Suffolk, England. It is run by 75 elected county councillors representing 63 divisions. It is a member of the East of England Local Government Association.

History
Established in 1974 and initially based at East Suffolk County Hall, the Council relocated to Endeavour House in Ipswich in 2004. In September 2010, the council announced that it would seek to outsource a number of its services, in an attempt to cut its own budget by 30%. Controversy surrounding the then CEO Andrea Hill, some concerning including £122,000 spent on management consultants, featured in the local and national press in 2011; this led to her facing a disciplinary hearing, and subsequently resigning.

Structure of the County Council
The County Council is led by its CEO Nicola Beach, who has been in this role since May 2018.

The Council is split into 5 distinct areas known as directorates. Each directorate has responsibility for a range of services and statutory requirements.

Responsibilities

Suffolk County Council is responsible for major services which are provided countywide. These include:
 Education and learning: schools, evening classes for adults, youth clubs and higher education grants.
 Environment: conservation of the countryside and public access to it, waste disposal and archaeological services.
 Leisure and culture: archives and support for arts and museums.
 Public safety: fire rescue service and emergency planning advice.
 Registrars: registration of births, marriages and deaths.
 Social care: care for older people who are physically or mentally infirm, or have a mental health problem, those with physical or learning disabilities and children and families who need protection and support.
 Trading standards: protecting consumers and giving advice.
 Transport and streets: maintaining and improving Suffolk's roads, footpaths and public rights of way, road safety, public transport co-ordination.

Shared services
Responsibility for some services is shared between the county council and borough, district and parish councils in Suffolk, including:
Conservation
Economic promotion
Emergency planning
Museums and the arts
Public transport
Street cleaning
Tourism

Suffolk Electoral Divisions

Suffolk County Council is organised into Electoral Divisions. These divisions are periodically reviewed. As of 2021, there were 63 divisions of which 51 each returned a single member, a further 12 divisions each being represented by two members.

Each councillor is responsible for their own Locality budget which amounted to £8,000 for the 2021/2022 financial year.

Elections

There are currently 75 Councillors elected to SCC. As at 2022 the council is run by the Conservative party. The Conservatives hold 55 seats on the Council, Greens 9, Labour 5, Liberal Democrats 4, Independents 1 and West Suffolk Independents 1.

These last elections were held on 6 May 2021.

References

External links 
Suffolk County Council

 
 
County councils of England
1974 establishments in England
Local authorities in Suffolk
Local education authorities in England
Major precepting authorities in England
Leader and cabinet executives